New York's 38th congressional district was a congressional district for the United States House of Representatives in New York. It was created in 1913 as a result of the 1910 U.S. Census and eliminated in 1983 as a result of the redistricting cycle after the 1980 Census. It was last represented by Republican Jack Kemp who was redistricted into the 31st congressional district.

Components
1973–1983:
Parts of Erie County
1971–1973:
All of Allegany County, Cattaraugus County, Chautauqua County and Steuben County
Parts of Erie County
1963–1971:
All of Allegany County, Cattaraugus County, Chautauqua County, Schuyler County and Steuben County
1953–1963:
All of Wayne County
Parts of Monroe County
1945–1953:
All of Cayuga County, Cortland County, Ontario County, Seneca County, Wayne County and Yates County
1913–1945:
Parts of Monroe County

List of members representing the district

Election results
The following chart shows historic election results. Bold type indicates victor. Italic type indicates incumbent.

References 

 Congressional Biographical Directory of the United States 1774–present
 Election Statistics 1920-present Clerk of the House of Representatives

38
Former congressional districts of the United States
1913 establishments in New York (state)
1983 disestablishments in New York (state)
Constituencies established in 1913
Constituencies disestablished in 1983